Mickaël Charvet (born 31 March 1988) is a French professional footballer who plays as a centre-back.

Career

Charvet started his career at Olympique Lyon, playing for the reserve team. He did not play for the first team, but made the bench for the first time in Lyon's Coupe de la Ligue match again Caen on 31 October 2007. He joined AC Ajaccio in 2008, but wasn't used much during his five seasons at the club. He spent the 2010–11 season on loan at the now-defunct Gap FC.

After an initial trial at the club, Charvet joined Paris FC in August 2012. He signed a one-year contract, which had a one-year extension clause should Paris FC remain in Championnat National at the end of the 2012–13 season. However, the club finished in 17th, the final relegation position, and were only reprieved due to the administrative relegation of FC Rouen. A legal dispute followed.

Charvet almost signed for Apollon Limassol after leaving Paris FC, but contractual problems stopped the move. He signed for Stade Montois in February 2014. At the start of the 2014–15 season he moved to Monts d'Or Azergues Foot for the first time.

In August 2016, after two seasons playing every league game for Mont d'Or Azergues, he joined AS Lyon Duchère. After two seasons, he left and rejoined Monts d'Or Azergues for the 2018–19 season. He left the club by the end of the season.

In June 2020, Charvet joined Saint-Priest.

References

External links

1988 births
Living people
Sportspeople from Bourg-en-Bresse
Footballers from Auvergne-Rhône-Alpes
Association football defenders
French footballers
Olympique Lyonnais players
AC Ajaccio players
Gap HAFC players
Stade Montois (football) players
GOAL FC players
Lyon La Duchère players
AS Saint-Priest players
Ligue 2 players
Championnat National players
Championnat National 3 players
Championnat National 2 players